Mustaid Billah (born on March 30, 1992) is an Indonesian footballer who currently plays for Persiba Balikpapan in the Indonesia Super League.

References

External links

1992 births
Association football midfielders
Living people
Indonesian footballers
Liga 1 (Indonesia) players
Persiba Balikpapan players